"O soave fanciulla" (O gentle maiden) is a romantic duet from the first act of Giacomo Puccini's 1896 opera La bohème It is sung as the closing number in act 1 by Rodolfo (tenor) and Mimì (soprano) where they realise they have fallen for each other.

Music
The duet, between 5 and 6 minutes in length, is written in the common time time signature, the key of A major, but ending in C major. The last bar in the orchestra is characterized by descending harp harmonics through the final C major chord.

When Mimì and Rodolfo realize they are in love (unison "A! tu sol comandi, amor!"/"Fremon già nell'anima"), the music returns to the opera's love leitmotif from Rodolfo's aria "Che gelida manina" ("talor dal mio forziere"). They leave the stage together singing "Amor!". Mimì's last note is a high C, marked perdendosi (fading away), and while an E below is written for Rodolfo, many tenors also sing the high C, making the last note unison. Following Rodolfo's "Che gelida manina" and Mimì's "Sì, mi chiamano Mimì", the duet concludes one of most romantic passages in all of opera.

Libretto
The libretto is by Luigi Illica and Giuseppe Giacosa. Rodolfo and Mimì have met for the first time a few minutes ago. He told her about his life ("Che gelida manina"), and asked her to tell him about hers ("Sì, mi chiamano Mimì"). In this duet, "O soave fanciulla", they realize that they have fallen in love.

Rodolfo's friends call him to join them but he would rather stay with Mimì, but she shyly suggests they all go out together. Rodolfo remarks how cold it is outside, but Mimì promises to stay near to him. She leaves the possibility of a later return to the garret open. They leave the stage.

References

External links
 List of notable recordings by Neil Kurtzman, medicine-opera.com
 , performed live by Renata Tebaldi and Jussi Björling, 1956
 , Renata Scotto and Luciano Pavarotti, Metropolitan Opera, 1977
 , Cheryl Barker, David Hobson, Baz Luhrmann's production for Opera Australia, 1993

Arias by Giacomo Puccini
Opera excerpts
Arias in Italian
Male–female vocal duets
1896 compositions